Off Book is a web series on digital culture and art created for PBS by Kornhaber Brown, a Webby award-winning production studio that creates web series, videos, and motion graphics.  The series has been viewed more than six million times, and is the most shared documentary series ever online. It has been featured on prominent websites including Wired, The Huffington Post, The Atlantic, Fast Company, Gizmodo, Engadget, Mashable, and USA Today.

References

External links
 Off Book on Twitter
 Off Book YouTube Channel

American non-fiction web series
Documentary web series